Weizhou is a town and the county seat of Wenchuan County, northwestern Sichuan province, Southwestern China. The town has an area of 128 square kilometers and a population of 31,409.

References

External links
 Profile of Weizhou

Towns in Sichuan
Wenchuan County